Mario Mazzone (December 31, 1958 – May 20, 2007) was an Argentine journalist and broadcaster.

1958 births
2007 deaths
People from Buenos Aires